Arf-GAP with SH3 domain, ANK repeat and PH domain-containing protein 2 is a protein that in humans is encoded by the ASAP2 gene.

This gene encodes a multidomain protein containing an N-terminal alpha-helical region with a coiled-coil motif, followed by a pleckstrin homology (PH) domain, an Arf-GAP domain, an ankyrin homology region, a proline-rich region, and a C-terminal Src homology 3 (SH3) domain. The protein localizes in the Golgi apparatus and at the plasma membrane, where it colocalizes with protein tyrosine kinase 2-beta (PYK2). The encoded protein forms a stable complex with PYK2 in vivo. This interaction appears to be mediated by binding of its SH3 domain to the C-terminal proline-rich domain of PYK2. The encoded protein is tyrosine phosphorylated by activated PYK2. In vitro it shows strong GTPase-activating protein (GAP) activity towards the small GTPases ADP-ribosylation factor (ARF) 1 and ARF5 and weak activity towards ARF6. The encoded protein is believed to function as an ARF GAP that controls ARF-mediated vesicle budding when recruited to Golgi membranes. In addition, it functions as a substrate and downstream target for PYK2 and SRC, a pathway that may be involved in the regulation of vesicular transport.

Interactions
DDEF2 has been shown to interact with PTK2B.

References

Further reading